Colleton State Park is a  state park located along U.S. Highway 15 between St. George and Walterboro, South Carolina, United States.  The smallest state park in the state of South Carolina, Colleton's main attraction is recreational access to the Edisto River in the form of paddling or fishing.  Several campsites for RVs and tents as well as some team-sport recreation facilities are also located in the site.  For many years, the park was underutilized due in part to an adjacent SCE&G coal-fire power plant, which discouraged many potential visitors from the park.  The power plant was closed by SCE&G at the end of 2012.  Local officials hope to potentially acquire the site and expand the park.

References

External links

Official state park website

Protected areas of Hampton County, South Carolina
State parks of South Carolina
Nature centers in South Carolina
Civilian Conservation Corps in South Carolina